Luciano Piquè (10 June 1935 – 2 November 2021) was an Italian professional footballer who played for Udinese, Genoa, Savona and Virtus Entella.

Managerial career
Having managed lower-league side Alassio while he played for them, Piquè would go on to manage at Canelli and Omegna, before taking charge of Pro Vercelli for the 1979–80 Serie D season.

References

1935 births
2021 deaths
Footballers from Venice
Italian footballers
Italian football managers
A.C. Mestre players
Udinese Calcio players
Genoa C.F.C. players
Calcio Padova players
Savona F.B.C. players
Virtus Entella players
F.C. Pro Vercelli 1892 managers
Association footballers not categorized by position